Just the Two of Us is the second collaborative studio album by Porter Wagoner and Dolly Parton. It was released on September 9, 1968, by RCA Victor. The album was produced by Bob Ferguson. It peaked at number five on the Billboard Top Country Albums chart and number 184 on the Billboard 200 chart. The album spawned three singles. "Holding on to Nothin'" and "We'll Get Ahead Someday" were top ten hits on the Billboard Hot Country Songs chart, peaking at numbers seven and five, respectively. The third single, "Jeannie's Afraid of the Dark", peaked at number 51.

Recording
Recording sessions for the album took place at RCA Studio B in Nashville, Tennessee, beginning on January 31, 1968. Three additional sessions followed on May 20, 21 and 22.

Release and promotion
The album was released September 9, 1968, on LP.

Singles
The album's first single, "Holding on to Nothin'", was released in March 1968 and debuted at number 60 on the Billboard Hot Country Songs chart dated April 13. It peaked at number seven on the chart dated June 1, its seventh week on the chart. It charted for 16 weeks. It also peaked at number 17 in Canada on the RPM Country Singles chart. "We'll Get Ahead Someday" was released as the second single in July and debuted at number 68 on the Billboard Hot Country Songs chart dated July 27. It peaked at number five on the chart dated September 28, its tenth week on the chart. The single charted for 13 weeks. The third single, "Jeannie's Afraid of the Dark", was released in September and debuted at number 66 on the Billboard Hot Country Songs chart dated October 5. It peaked at number 51 on the chart dated November 2. It charted for six weeks.

Critical reception

Billboard published a review of the album in the September 21, 1968 issue, which said, "Wagoner and Parton have proved a hot sales combination for the singles charts, and their second LP built around their singles hits, "Holding on to Nothin'", "The Dark End of the Street", and "We'll Get Ahead Someday", is sure to prove a hot piece of album product."

Cashbox published a review of the album also, saying, "After scoring excellent success with their initial duet LP, as well as with several singles, Porter Wagoner and Dolly Parton launch their second album on the heels of their latest single, "Holding on to Nothin'". Kicking off the set with that track, the twosome also make a winning combination with such additional tracks as "The Dark End of the Street" and "I Washed My Face in the Morning Dew", among others."

AllMusic gave the album 2.5 out of 5 stars.

Commercial performance
The album debuted at number 41 on the Billboard Top Country Albums chart dated October 5, 1968. It peaked at number five on the chart dated April 5, 1969, its 27th week on the chart. The album charted for a total of 49 weeks.

Reissues
The album was included in the 2014 box set Just Between You and Me: The Complete Recordings, 1967–1976, marking the first time it had been reissued since its original release. The album was released as a digital download on August 17, 2018.

Track listing

Personnel
Adapted from the album liner notes and RCA recording session records.

Jerry Carrigan – drums
Anita Carter – backing vocals
Pete Drake – steel
Dolores Edgin – backing vocals
Bob Ferguson – producer, liner notes
Roy M. Huskey, Jr. – bass
Mack Magaha – fiddle
George McCormick – rhythm guitar
Wayne Moss – electric guitar
Al Pachucki – recording engineer
Dolly Parton – lead vocals
Hargus Robbins – piano
Jerry Stembridge – electric guitar
Buck Trent – banjo
Porter Wagoner – lead vocals

Charts

Release history

References

1968 albums
Dolly Parton albums
Porter Wagoner albums
Vocal duet albums
Albums produced by Bob Ferguson (music)
RCA Records albums